Crooked Little Thoughts is the thirteenth studio album by Australian rock band The Black Sorrows. The album was released as a 3CD + 72 page book package in February 2012.
All tracks were written by Joe Camilleri and Nick Smith and each track is accompanied by a painting by Australian artist Victor Rubin.

Reception
Michael Dywer from The West Australian said; "Crooked Little Thoughts demands engagement of the sitting down, listening and touching kind. Each disc is a digestible eight songs long, each a fresh take on Camilleri's panoramic appreciation of the soul of American music from zydeco to pop, with a cosy throng of ace muso comrades. With highlights as varied as Atlanta Coogan's roaring gospel vocal on "Lovin' You", the spooky New Orleans curb crawl of "Only Time Will Tell", the sleazy Miami disco of "Money Talkin'", the dustbowl waltz of "Salvation Song" and the Quintet du Hot Club swing of "The End of Time", these thoughts run deep enough for a long shelf life."

Track listing 
 CD1
 "Money Talkin'" - 4:36
 "Our Town"	- 4:09
 "Shelley" - 3:52	
 "Lovin' You"	- 3:18
 "Waitin' for the Hammer" - 3:22
 "Salvation Song"	- 3:18
 "Lost in Wonder"	- 4:21
 "Somewhere in this World" - 3:57

 CD2
 "Lover's Story" - 4:00
 "I'm the One" - 4:00	
 "Perfect Ending"	- 4:26
 "Nothin' Lasts Forever" - 4:19	
 "A Fool and the Moon" - 3:54	
 "How Could I Have Been So Wrong?" - 4:55
 "The Romantic Death of Me" - 3:33
 "The End of Time" - 3:44

 CD3	
 "The Stars in the Sky" - 2:59	
 "Only Time Will Tell" - 3:46
 "Long Cold Night" - 3:41	
 "The Spell is Broken" - 4:55
 "Life's Sad Parade" - 3:29	
 "Until the Day I Die" - 3:10	
 "It's Only Xmas" - 4:33 
 "Dustbowl Blues" - 2:59

Release history

References

External links
 "Crooked Little Thoughts" at discogs.com

2012 albums
The Black Sorrows albums
Albums produced by Joe Camilleri